The Voyage of Charles Darwin was a 1978 BBC television serial depicting the life of Charles Darwin, focusing largely on his voyage on . The series encompasses his university days to the 1859 publication of his book On the Origin of Species and his death and is loosely based on Darwin's own letters, diaries, and journals, especially The Voyage of the Beagle and The Autobiography of Charles Darwin. It starred Malcolm Stoddard as Darwin and Andrew Burt as Captain Robert FitzRoy.

The barque  was refitted to depict HMS Beagle.

The series was repeated in December 1995. It was broadcast in the US on PBS starting 27 January 1980 and was hosted by Neil Armstrong. It was produced by Christopher Ralling.

Cast
Malcolm Stoddard – Charles Darwin
Andrew Burt – Robert FitzRoy
Peter Settelen – Lieutenant Sullivan
David Ashton – Lieutenant Wickham
Jenny Quayle – Catherine Darwin

Episodes

Reception
The Christian Science Monitor called the series "a profoundly stimulating mix of entertainment and information".

Awards
The series won the 1979 BAFTA Award for Best Factual Series and for Best Cinematography. It was nominated for one other BAFTA. It also won Best Documentary Series from the Broadcasting Press Guild Awards in 1979.

References

External links
 

1978 British television series debuts
1978 British television series endings
1970s British drama television series
BBC television dramas
1970s British television miniseries
English-language television shows
Television shows set in Cornwall